Givira aroa is a moth in the family Cossidae. It is found in Venezuela.

References

Givira
Moths described in 1894